The Boone Springs Fire was a wildfire in Elko County, Nevada in the United States. The fire was first reported on July 4, 2018. During its height, the fire threatened ranch facilities, traffic on U.S. Route 93 Alternate, and Boone Springs Station.

Events
The Boone Springs Fire started around 11 a.m. on the Fourth of July. The cause remains unknown. Burning understory and short grass, the fire threatens minor ranch structures and U.S. Route 93 Alternate. The fire was contained on July 9 .

Impacts

The fire threatened the Dolly Varden Springs Ranch,  U.S. Route 93 Alternate, and Boone Springs Station.

References

2018 Nevada wildfires
June 2018 events in the United States
July 2018 events in the United States
Elko County, Nevada